Stone Mountain is a city in DeKalb County, Georgia, United States. The population was 6,703 according to the 2020 US Census. Stone Mountain is in the eastern part of DeKalb County and is a suburb of Atlanta that encompasses nearly 1.7 square miles. It lies near and touches the western base of the geological formation Stone Mountain.  Locals often call the city "Stone Mountain Village" to distinguish it from the larger unincorporated area traditionally considered Stone Mountain and Stone Mountain Park.

History

Stone Mountain's history began long before European settlers and the Creek Indians before them. Evidence of numerous earlier Native American tribes, including mound builders, has been found in the area.

The Treaty of Indian Springs in 1821 opened a large swath of Georgia for settlement by non-Native Americans on former Creek Indian land, including present-day Stone Mountain Village. In 1822, the area that now makes up the city was made a part of the newly formed DeKalb County.

Settlement
By the 1820s, Rock Mountain, as it was then called, was "a major travel center", with an inn for travelers. A stagecoach line linking the village with Georgia's capital, Milledgeville, began in 1825. Another stage line ran to Winder and Athens. In 1828 another stage line began trips to Dahlonega, and a fourth connected the community with Macon. "Hundreds of people visited Rock Mountain in the summer [of 1828] and...a house of entertainment was nearby." Rail service did not reach the town, by then New Gibraltar, until 1845.

A post office was created in 1834 on the old Augusta Road, and Andrew Johnson, called the founder of New Gibraltar and first mayor, around whose house the city limits were drawn, built a hotel along the road in 1836. A storm destroyed the tower in 1849; in 1851, Thomas Henry built a smaller,  tower, with telescopes so it could serve as an observatory. Visitors to the mountain traveled by rail and road, then hiked up the  mountaintop trail to the top. By 1850, Stone Mountain had become a popular destination for Atlanta urbanites who endured the four-hour round trip by rail just to experience its natural beauty, lodging, and attractions.

Industry
Granite quarrying at the mountain was the area's lifeblood for decades, employing many thousands. The excellent grade of building stone from the mountain was used in many notable structures, including the locks of the Panama Canal, the roof of the bullion depository at Fort Knox, Philadelphia's Liberty National Building, and the steps in the east wing of the U.S. Capitol.

In August 1846, New Gibraltar hosted Georgia's first state fair, then known as the Agriculture Fair and Internal Improvement Jubilee. The fair had just one exhibit—three horses and two cows, both belonging to the event's organizer, John Graves. The next year, the village again hosted the event, which featured caskets, marble, embroidery, brooms, bedspreads, vegetables, blooded stock, wheat, farm tools, and a magnetic telegraph. Stone Mountain hosted the event until 1850, when it moved to Macon.

Civil War
Though DeKalb County voted against secession from the United States, it was not spared the devastation of the Civil War. Stone Mountain Village went unscathed until the Battle of Atlanta, when it was destroyed by men under the command of General James B. McPherson on July 19, 1864.  Several antebellum homes were spared as they were used as hospitals. The railroad depot's roof burned, but the building stood, owing to its 2-foot-thick granite walls.

From the village’s destruction in July 1864 until November, Union forces scavenged Stone Mountain and the surrounding area, taking corn, wheat, cotton, cattle, and other goods. On November 15, 1864, between 12,000 and 15,000 Union troops marched through Stone Mountain and further destroyed the rail lines. The rails were rendered useless by heating them over burning railroad ties, then twisting them around trees. The term Sherman’s neckties was coined for this form of destruction.

Birth of Shermantown

After the Civil War ended, housing in the area was rebuilt as Stone Mountain granite was again in demand for construction across the nation. A significant portion of the quarry's work force were African Americans, but they were generally excluded from areas where white families lived, so a shantytown, Shermantown, came into being at the southeast side of the village; its name was a reference to Union General William T. Sherman.

In 1868, Reverend R. M. Burson organized Bethsaida Baptist Church to serve Shermantown. A church building was then built under Reverend F. M. Simons at what is now 853 Fourth Street. Simons was among a delegation of southern African American pastors to meet with Sherman in Washington, D.C. after the war to discuss the treatment of the freedmen. Bethsaida Baptist is still an active part of the Stone Mountain Village.

By the 20th century, much of Shermantown’s original structures had been replaced. Bethsaida’s original wooden structure was replaced by stone in 1920. Though Shermantown has mostly integrated into the growing Stone Mountain Village, it retains its own distinct community.

Rebirth of the Ku Klux Klan
1915 was the year of the rebirth of the Ku Klux Klan, a white supremacist organization. Members assembled at Stone Mountain with permission of quarry owner Samuel Venable, an active member. Their activities, including annual cross-burnings, continued for over 40 years, but Stone Mountain’s association with the Klan began to erode when the State of Georgia began to acquire the mountain and surrounding property in 1958. In 1960, Governor Ernest Vandiver condemned the property the state had purchased in order to void the perpetual easements Venable had granted the Klan. This ended any official link between Stone Mountain and the Klan.

Civil Rights Movement
During the Civil Rights Movement's March on Washington, on August 28, 1963, Martin Luther King Jr. referred to Stone Mountain in his iconic "I Have a Dream" speech when he proclaimed, "let freedom ring from Stone Mountain of Georgia!" Charles Burris, the Village's first African-American mayor, dedicated the Freedom Bell on Main Street in King's honor on February 26, 2000. At an annual ceremony held on Martin Luther King Jr. Day, the bell is rung to commemorate King's legacy.

Many names
The mountain has been known by countless names throughout the centuries. It was called Crystal Mountain by 16th-century Spanish explorer Juan Pardo when he visited in 1567. The Creek Indians who inhabited the area at that time used a name translating to "Lone Mountain". Around the turn of the 19th century, settlers called it Rock Mountain or Rock Fort Mountain.  By the end of the 1830s, Stone Mountain had become the generally accepted name. Like the mountain, the village formed at its base was initially known as Rock Mountain but was incorporated as New Gibraltar in 1839 by an act of the General Assembly. In 1847 the Georgia legislature changed the name to Stone Mountain.

Cemetery
The Stone Mountain Cemetery, established around 1850, is a microcosm of the village’s past. It is the final resting place for roughly 200 unknown Confederate soldiers. 71 known Confederate soldiers are buried there, along with James Sprayberry, a Union soldier. Another notable site is the grave of George Pressley Trout, who is buried there with his wife and his horse. James B. Rivers, the village’s first African American police chief, is at rest there on a hillside facing the mountain. The cemetery is still in use.

Government
Stone Mountain is governed by a council-manager form of government. Citizens elect a mayor and six council members who are all elected at-large. The terms of office are four years, with elections staggered every two years. Daily city operations are managed by an appointed professional city manager. Services provided by the city include police, public works, code enforcement, and municipal court.

The city also has standing commissions for historic preservation, downtown development, and planning & zoning. The city holds a City of Ethics designation from the Georgia Municipal Association and is a member of Main Street America.

Geography
Stone Mountain is at the western base of the quartz monzonite dome monadnock of the same name. While Stone Mountain city proper is completely within DeKalb County, the postal regions designated and traditionally considered as Stone Mountain include portions of DeKalb and Gwinnett Counties.

Demographics

2020 census

As of the 2020 United States census, there were 6,703 people, 2,351 households, and 1,578 families residing in the city.

2017
According to 2017 US Census Bureau estimates, Stone Mountain has 6,368 residents, a 9.0% increase since 2010. There are 2,519 households, with an average of 2.42 persons per household. 8.9% of Stone Mountain residents are foreign-born. Estimates of the racial makeup of the city are 73% African-American/Black, 22.1% White, 1% Asian, 0.9% Native American/Alaskan, and 1.1% of two or more races.

Of persons 25 years or older, 87.3% are high school graduates or higher, while 30.8% have attained a bachelor's degree or higher. The median income is $35,964, with a per capita income of $21,134.

Arts, culture and leisure
 ART Station Contemporary Arts Center and Theatre Company, a multi-disciplinary arts center, is in the Trolley Car Barn (5384 Manor Drive), built by the Georgia Railway and Power Company in 1913. ART Station hosts shows and gallery events throughout the year, including the Tour of Southern Ghosts each year in October. 
 Wells-Brown House (1036 Ridge Avenue) is an elegant early 1870s neoclassical residence that is home of the Stone Mountain Historical Society. The Wells-Brown House houses a growing artifact collection and research library. 
 Cart-Friendly Community: Stone Mountain is one of a handful of Georgia communities that permit golf carts on city streets with a city-issued inspection permit. Carts are also permitted within adjacent Stone Mountain Park, giving the community an added leisure activity.
 Museum of Miniature Chairs (994 Main Street): a three-room gallery and shop featuring over 3000 miniature chairs.
 PATH: the Atlanta Regional Trail of the PATH off-road trails, which serves walkers, runners, cyclists, and skaters, enters the village on East Ponce de Leon Avenue, goes south on Main Street, and continues into Stone Mountain Park via a trail built atop the old railroad spur that once connected the CSX tracks to the Stone Mountain Scenic Railroad.

In film

The Stone Mountain area has been a beneficiary of Georgia's flourishing film industry. Film crews and production personnel have become common sights in Stone Mountain Village. Due to the demand for filming in the historic downtown area, requests for filming in the village are handled by the downtown development authority.  The proceeds help fund festivals and other public events for the community.

Most of the shops and buildings on Main Street were built right after the turn of the 20th century and maintain many of the original facades. This has provided an appropriate backdrop for a number of filming projects, ranging from period pieces to those requiring a quaint village setting.

Parts of motion pictures like Footloose (2011) and Need for Speed (2014) were filmed in the village. The growing number of television show credits include The Vampire Diaries, Kevin (Probably) Saves the World, MacGyver, and the Netflix science fiction/horror series Stranger Things.

Organizations
Stone Mountain Village is home to a number of community, civic, and outreach organizations:
 Stone Mountain Historical Society, 1036 Ridge Avenue
 GFWC Stone Mountain Woman's Club, 5513 East Mountain Street
 Stone Mountain Masonic Lodge No. 449, F&AM, 840 VFW Drive
 DeKalb Fraternal Order of Police Lodge No. 10, 1238 Ridge Avenue
 Side by Side Brain Injury Clubhouse, 1001 Main Street
 Stone Mountain Cooperative Ecumenical Ministry (Food Bank), 5324 West Mountain Street

Education

The children of Stone Mountain are served by the DeKalb County Public Schools. Stone Mountain Elementary School and Champion Theme Middle School are within the city limits.

Most residents in the city limits are zoned to Stone Mountain Elementary School, in the city limits. Some areas are zoned to Rockbridge Elementary School, outside of the city limits. All residents of Stone Mountain are zoned to: Stone Mountain Middle School, and Stone Mountain High School; the middle school and the high school are outside the city limits.

Georgia Military College (GMC) has a satellite campus in Stone Mountain Village at 5325 Manor Drive.

DeKalb County Public Library operates the Stone Mountain-Sue Kellogg Library (952 Leon Street).

Notable people

Jerry Blackwell, late AWA professional wrestler, nicknamed the "Mountain from Stone Mountain"
MarShon Brooks, NBA basketball player for the Memphis Grizzlies, grew up in Stone Mountain
Domonic Brown, professional baseball player for the Tecolotes de los Dos Laredos of the Mexican League, attended high school in Stone Mountain
Kevin Cone, retired NFL football player from Stone Mountain
Noureen DeWulf, actress; grew up in Stone Mountain
Donald Glover, actor, writer, comedian, and rapper; grew up in Stone Mountain
Raury, singer, songwriter, and rapper; grew up in Stone Mountain
Fast Life Youngstaz, American hip hop group
Jim Goad, author and publisher; resides in Stone Mountain
Phil Gordon, professional poker player, grew up in Stone Mountain
Andrew Goudelock, professional basketball player for the Shandong Golden Stars of the Chinese Basketball Association (CBA).
Malcolm Harvey, former sheriff of Stone Mountain who has been implicated in the murders of two women in Zaragoza, Spain in 1992
Bruce Irvin, professional football player for the Chicago Bears, briefly attended high school in Stone Mountain
Connie Johnson, professional baseball player for Chicago White Sox and Baltimore Orioles and a star for the Negro league Kansas City Monarchs, born in Stone Mountain
DeQuan Jones, professional basketball player for Hapoel Holon of the Israeli Premier League, originally from Stone Mountain
Wally Joyner, retired professional baseball player, attended high school in Stone Mountain
Kenny Ladler, NFL football player for the New York Giants, grew up in Stone Mountain
Selina Majors, better known by her professional moniker "Bambi", professional wrestler, born in Stone Mountain
Apollo Crews, professional WWE  wrestler billed as from Stone Mountain
Kenneth Parcell, fictional character in the television series 30 Rock, hails from Stone Mountain and frequently refers to it; the actor Jack McBrayer is actually from nearby Conyers
Brandon Phillips, professional baseball player for the Boston Red Sox, attended school in Stone Mountain
Cyhi the Prynce, rapper and songwriter from Stone Mountain
Jake "The Snake" Roberts, pro wrestler, is billed from Stone Mountain
Richard T. Scott, figurative painter and writer, is from Stone Mountain
Silentó, rapper, singer, and songwriter, native of Stone Mountain
Hugh Thompson, Jr, Vietnam War veteran known for his role in saving many civilian lives in the My Lai Massacre, grew up in Stone Mountain
Theodore Van Kirk, late navigator of the Enola Gay when it dropped the first atomic bomb on Hiroshima, resided in Stone Mountain
Kara Walker, painter, lived in Stone Mountain as a child
Josh Wolff, Major League Soccer player, from Stone Mountain
 Isaiah Zuber, NFL wide receiver, born and raised in Stone Mountain
 Rick Beato, YouTube personality, musician, songwriter, music producer and educator, resides and runs Black Dog Sound Studios in Stone Mountain.

References

Further reading
 Stone Mountain Historical Society, Images of America: Stone Mountain (Arcadia Publishing, 2014)
 Coletti, Dr. George D.N., Stone Mountain: The Granite Sentinel (Granite Sentinel Press, 2012)
 Coletti, Dr. George D.N., The Red Spoke (Dragonfly Creek Books, 2015)

External links
 

City of Stone Mountain official website
ART Station website
Stone Mountain Historical Society website
New Georgia Encyclopedia
Golden Ink (1994–2003). About North Georgia: Stone Mountain 
Stone Mountain at City-Data.com

Cities in Georgia (U.S. state)
Cities in DeKalb County, Georgia
Cities in the Atlanta metropolitan area
Stone Mountain
Ku Klux Klan in Georgia (U.S. state)